3H is a symbol for tritium.

3H or 3-H may also refer to:

3H, or British Rail Class 205
3H Movement, a liberal Turkish youth organization
3H Biomedical, a Swedish biotechnology company
Mu-3H, a model of Mu (rocket family)
Yuri 3H, a Broadcasting Satellite (Japanese)
SSH 3H (WA), alternate designation for Washington State Route 27
Old Natchez Trace (230-3H); see Old Natchez Trace segments listed on the National Register of Historic Places

See also

H3 (disambiguation)
HHH (disambiguation)
Triple H (disambiguation)